Masquerade is the ninth album by German band Running Wild. It is the first in a trilogy of a theme of good versus evil, continued with The Rivalry and concluded with Victory.

Track listing
All tracks written by Rolf Kasparek except where noted

Release
Two different limited edition releases exist; a wooden box containing a poster and a big box treasure chest that comes with the Death or Glory Tour - Live VHS, the adrian bandana, a 26-page booklet and the original album

Personnel
 Rolf Kasparek – vocals, guitar
 Thilo Hermann – guitars
 Thomas Smuszynski – bass guitar
 Jörg Michael – drums

Additional Musician
 Ralf Nowy – effects on "The Contract / The Crypts of Hades" and "Underworld"

Production
 Rock 'n' Rolf – producer
 Karl-Ulrich Walterbach – executive producer
 Gerhard Woelfe – engineer, mixing
 Marisa Jacobi – layout, typography
 Andreas Marschall – cover art

Charts

References

1995 albums
Noise Records albums
Running Wild (band) albums